The Blackwell Companion to Science and Christianity is a reference work in science and religion, edited by J.B. Stump and Alan G. Padgett, and published by Wiley-Blackwell in 2012. It contains 54 new essays written by an international list of 55 authors, many of them leading scholars in the discipline of science and religion, and others new or up-and-coming voices in the field. The editors claim, "We are seeking to introduce and advance serious thinking and talking about science and Christianity, particularly as they interconnect. We are reflecting on the work of scientists and theologians, trying to find points of contact and points of tension which help to illuminate these practices and doctrines in clear, scholarly light." The book has received positive reviews in Choice, Reference Reviews, Themelios and Perspectives on Science and Christian Faith. The article by Sean M. Carroll generated significant attention when it was discussed on the Huffington Post.

Contents 
Part I - Historical Episodes

Part II - Methodology

Part III - Natural Theology

Part IV - Cosmology and Physics

Part V - Evolution

Part VI - The Human Sciences

Part VII - Christian Bioethics

Part VIII - Metaphysical Implications

Part IX - The Mind

Part X - Theology

Part XI - Significant Figures of the Twentieth Century in Science and Christianity

References

External links 
 The Blackwell Companion to Science and Christianity on the Wiley website
 Google Books page
 WorldCat entry

American non-fiction books
2012 non-fiction books
Christianity and science
Wiley (publisher) books